Hugh O'Conor by birth or Hugo Oconór in Spanish, was a military governor of northern Mexico. He was appointed governor of Texas by the Spanish viceroy of New Spain in 1767. O'Conor was called "The Red Captain" by the Apache, both for the color of his hair and his formidable military leadership.

O'Conor was the founding father of the city of Tucson, Arizona, having authorized the construction of a military fort in that location in 1775. In 1777, O'Conor requested, due to his failing health, to be transferred to the Yucatan Peninsula, whereupon he was promoted to brigadier general and appointed Governor of Yucatan Peninsula. He served there until his death in 1779.

Biography 
O'Conor was born in 1732 in Dublin, Ireland, into the Gaelic-Irish aristocratic O'Conor Don Family. He was a descendant of Toirdhealbhach Mór Ua Conchobhair, King of Connacht and High King of Ireland. Because of the Penal Laws which restricted the political, religious and commercial rights of Irish Catholics, O'Conor left his homeland and moved to Spain where his cousins Alexander (Alejandro) and Dominic O'Reilly, were serving as officers in the Spanish Royal Army. He was established in Aragon.

In his youth he joined the regiment of Volunteers of Aragon, eventually acquiring the title of major. During his years in the military, he was sent to Cuba and Mexico City. There he distinguished himself by his ability as a military strategist and was appointed captain for the Northern Territory to exercise dominion in the region.

He went to Texas to investigate a dispute around San Agustín de Ahumada Presidio between Governor Ángel de Martos y Navarrete and Rafael Martínez Pacheco (future governor of Texas). It was at this time that he obtained the title of inspector general of the Provincias Internas (general inspector of the Interior Provinces). Later, in 1767, he was appointed governor of Texas, in replacement of Martos y Navarrete. When he took office, he found that one of its major cities, San Antonio, was shattered by frequent attacks of several Indian tribes. Therefore, the new governor set up a garrison at Los Adaes to protect the city.

In 1771 he became commander of the Chihuahua frontier and on January 20, 1773, he was appointed commandant inspector of presidios under the office of Coronel.
He and Governor Juan María Vicencio de Ripperdá rejected the petition of Antonio Gil Y'Barbo that the settlers could return to their original homes. To strengthen the protection of Nueva Vizcaya, Coahuila, Sonora, Mexico he decided to expel the Apaches in the region, making war against these peoples in 1775 and 1776. Many Apaches died in the war. The Apaches who survived fled to more western areas. In 1777, he suffered a serious illness and was sent to Yucatan Peninsula, with the title of governor and brigadier general of the Mexican province, which was a lesser charge to that which he usually occupied. He died on March 8, 1779, at Quinta de Miraflores, in Mérida, Yucatán.

Legacy 
In modern English translation, the order that founded the fort at what is now Tucson read as follows.

See also
List of Texas Governors and Presidents
Presidio San Augustin del Tucson
Irish military diaspora

Footnotes

External links
 Irish Migration Studies in Latin America document containing information about Hugo Oconór

Governors of Spanish Texas
Governors of Yucatán (state)
Spanish colonial governors and administrators
1779 deaths
1732 births
Irish emigrants to Spain